Tewkesbury is a locality and small rural community in the local government area of Burnie in the North West region of Tasmania.
The 2016 census determined a population of 76 for the state suburb of Tewkesbury.

History
The locality was gazetted in 1966.

Geography
The Guide River forms part of the eastern boundary, and the Cam River forms the north-western boundary. The Melba rail line follows the south-eastern boundary.

Road infrastructure
The C101 route (Oonah Road) passes through from north-east to south-west. Route C103 (Talunah Road) starts at an intersection with C101 and runs south before exiting. Route C104 (Guide Road) starts at an intersection with C101 and runs north before exiting.

References

Burnie, Tasmania
Towns in Tasmania